The 1977 Angus District Council election took place on the 3 May 1977 to elect members of Angus District Council, as part of that years Scottish local elections.

Election results

References

1977 Scottish local elections
1977